Gobondry is a cadastral parish of Kennedy County.

References

Parishes of Kennedy County